Nowshahr-e Surgi (also Romanized as Nowshahr-e Sūrgī) is a village in Byaban Rural District, Byaban District, Minab County, Hormozgan Province, Iran. At the 2006 census, its population was 67, in 9 families.

References 

Populated places in Minab County